The Flood is a 2019 British drama film, directed by Anthony Woodley, from a screenplay by Helen Kingston. It stars Lena Headey, Ivanno Jeremiah, Mandip Gill, Jack Gordon, Peter Singh, Arsher Ali and Iain Glen. It was released on 21 June 2019, by Curzon Artificial Eye.

Synopsis 
Wendy (Lena Headey), a hardened immigration officer is offered a high-profile asylum case, judged on her ability to quickly and clinically reject applicants. Through her interrogation, she must uncover whether Haile (Ivanno Jeremiah) is lying and has a more sinister reason for seeking asylum. We follow Haile on his perilous 5,000 km journey over oceans, across borders, and amidst the flurry of the Calais Jungle to find solace and safety in the UK. But now he must cross the final hurdle.

Cast
 Lena Headey as Wendy
 Ivanno Jeremiah as Haile
 Mandip Gill as Reema
 Jack Gordon as Russell
 Peter Singh as Faz
 Arsher Ali as Nasrat
 Iain Glen as Philip

Production
In March 2017, it was announced Lena Headey had joined the cast of the film, with Anthony Woodley directing from a screenplay by Helen Kingston. Headey will also serve as an executive producer on the film, while Megatopia Films will produce the film. In April 2017, Ivanno Jeremiah, Iain Glen and Jack Gordon had joined the cast of the film.

Filming
Filming began in April, 2017, in London and the Calais Jungle. Joss Bay in Kent doubled as an italian coastline during filming and production also visited the Port of Ramsgate.

Release
In May 2019, Curzon Artificial Eye acquired U.K. distribution rights to the film. The film was released on 21 June 2019. It was scheduled to be released in the United States on 1 May 2020, by Samuel Goldwyn Films.

Reception

Box office
In the United Kingdom, the film opened on 21 June 2019 grossing £3,983 from 4 screens in its opening weekend, finishing twenty-ninth at the box office. It grossed another £113 in its second weekend and grossing £5,563 through 10 days. The film has grossed a total of £5,966 in its fourth week of release.

Critical response 

The site's critical consensus reads, "Imperfect yet ultimately honorable, The Flood takes an empathetic look at the plight of asylum seekers in the 21st century."

References

External links
 

2019 films
British drama films
Samuel Goldwyn Films films
2010s English-language films
2010s British films